Polish Communist Party may refer to:
Communist Party of Poland (1918–1938)
Polish Workers' Party (1942–1948)
Polish United Workers' Party (1948–1990)
Communist Party of Poland (Mijal) (1965–1978)
 (1990–2002)
Polish Communist Party (2002–present)